The Town of North Fremantle was a local government area in metropolitan Perth across the Swan River from Fremantle.

History
On 13 September 1895, the Municipality of North Fremantle was declared. On 1 July 1961, it became a Town following enactment of the Local Government Act 1960. It amalgamated into the City of Fremantle on 1 November 1961.

Suburbs
The suburb of North Fremantle was the only suburb within this local government area.

Populations

References

Former local government areas of Western Australia
1871 establishments in Australia
1961 disestablishments in Australia
City of Fremantle
North Fremantle, Western Australia